South Norfolk  was an independent city in the South Hampton Roads region of eastern Virginia and is now a section of the city of Chesapeake, one of the cities of Hampton Roads which surround the harbor of Hampton Roads and are linked by the Hampton Roads Beltway.

History

Located a few miles south of the larger city of Norfolk along the Southern Branch Elizabeth River, South Norfolk became an incorporated town in Norfolk County in 1919. Within three years, it became an independent city.

In the early 1920s, streetcars ran from Ocean View in Norfolk, to South Norfolk. There was a ferry that docked at the end of Indian River Road and crossed the Southern Branch Elizabeth River to Portsmouth.

The much larger independent city of Norfolk expanded rapidly into the adjacent communities after World War II.  In 1963, after a referendum in South Norfolk and Norfolk County and with approval from the Virginia General Assembly, South Norfolk and Norfolk County merged to form the independent city of city of Chesapeake in 1963. The new name was also selected through a voter referendum.

Revitalization

The Gateway at South Norfolk was the city's first major redevelopment project generated by the city's South Norfolk Revitalization Plan. Harris-Judah LLC, the builder/developer behind The Gateway at South Norfolk, has announced that affordable, single family homes are available in Chesapeake's South Norfolk area. The homes, which are row-style, are located on B Street and a total of approximately 15 will be available. Construction started in 2010 and ended in 2014.With only one public library and one apartment complex compared to the promised 133 Harris-Judah LLC promised to The Community of South Norfolk.To this day sits empty lot of the promises big corporations will give to small neighborhoods.

See also 
 Chesapeake, Virginia
 Political subdivisions of Virginia#Boroughs
 Norfolk County, Virginia
 Former counties, cities, and towns of Virginia

References 
http://www.cityofchesapeake.net/Assets/documents/departments/planning/south-norfolk-historic-district-nomination-report.pdf
http://www.cityofchesapeake.net/Assets/documents/departments/planning/complan/Appendix_G-Poindexter-optimized.pdf

Boroughs of Chesapeake, Virginia
Chesapeake, Virginia communities
Former municipalities in Virginia
1919 establishments in Virginia
Populated places established in 1919
1963 disestablishments in Virginia